St Pauls Catholic College, (colloquially as St Pauls), is an independent, fee-paying, Roman Catholic single-sex school for boys, located in Greystanes, a western suburb of Sydney, New South Wales. The college is located on Old Prospect Rd. The college caters for students in years 7-12, with over 1000 students and over 120 teachers.
 
The college is noted in honour of the Christian patron, St Paul. It was originally named St Simon Stock High School and Newman High School. It is behind the OLQP Parish in Greystanes and next to OLQP Primary School. Its vicinity becomes the host of the annual Maltese Festival around September.

History
St Paul's Catholic College was founded in 1958, commonly referred to as the new Catholic School in the district of Pendle Hill. It was originally named St Simon Stock School.

The school took its motto Esto Vir, which means "Be a Man".

Over the years, the school took on a new name and motto. The 19th-Century English convert and thinker John Henry Newman was the inspiration for the new name and the new motto was "Heart speaks to Heart". The school's library and resource centre adopted his name and named it 'John Henry Newman Library'.

Finally, the school was renamed again to St Paul's. The new motto for St Paul's is "Many Gifts - One Community".
Building

See also 

 List of Catholic schools in New South Wales
 Catholic education in Australia

References

Boys' schools in New South Wales
Educational institutions established in 1958
1958 establishments in Australia
Catholic secondary schools in Sydney
Roman Catholic Diocese of Parramatta